British television presenter Louis Theroux has presented a number of documentaries since 1998. His work includes studies of unusual and taboo subcultures, crime and the justice system, and celebrities. He also acted as a correspondent for the TV Nation documentary series.

Louis Theroux's Weird Weekends

Series 1 (1998)

Series 2 (1999)

Series 3 (2000)

When Louis Met...

Series 1 (2000–2001)

Series 2 (2002)

BBC Two specials

One-off episodes

LA Stories

Dark States

Altered States

Life on the Edge 
Life on the Edge is a series released during the social distancing restrictions due to the COVID-19 pandemic in the UK in 2020. It follows Theroux, in his home, discussing the content and making of many of his past documentaries, including Weird Weekends, interspersed with clips and interviews with participants.

Forbidden America
Forbidden America is a three-part series focusing on social media use in the United States among several groups, including the alt-right, rappers and pornographic film actors.

Louis Theroux Interviews... 
Louis Theroux gets up close and personal with the UK's biggest stars in the way only he can.

My Scientology Movie 

A documentary film about Scientology in which Theroux teams up with former senior church official Mark Rathbun, the film takes an unconventional approach, after the Church of Scientology refused to cooperate in its making. It features actors "auditioning" for parts playing high-profile Scientologists in scenes recreating accounts from ex-members about incidents involving senior church management. Initially released on 7 October 2016 in the UK, and 3 March 2017 in the US.

KSI: In Real Life 

A documentary film about the life and career of musician, boxer and YouTuber KSI. The documentary was released on 26 January 2023.

References

External links
 Louis Theroux’s Shows and Books on Louis Theroux's official website
 

Louis Theroux
2000s British television series
BBC television documentaries
Louis Theroux
Lists of documentaries
Lists of documentary television series episodes